Brett Maher may refer to:

Brett Maher (basketball) (born 1973), Australian basketball player
Brett Maher (American football) (born 1989), American football placekicker